Ángel De Jesús (born February 13, 1997) is a Dominican professional baseball pitcher in the Detroit Tigers organization. He made his MLB debut in 2022.

Career

De Jesús signed with the Detroit Tigers as an international free agent on May 10, 2016. He made his professional debut with the Dominican Summer League Tigers. He returned to the DSL Tigers in 2017, posting a 2.20 ERA in 14 appearances (8 of them starts). De Jesús split the 2018 season between the DSL Tigers and the rookie-level GCL Tigers, accumulating a 5–3 record and 2.83 ERA with 68 strikeouts across 14 games (12 starts). In 2019, De Jesús split the season between the Single-A West Michigan Whitecaps and the High-A Lakeland Flying Tigers, pitching to a cumulative 1.61 ERA with 85 strikeouts in 61.1 innings pitched across 36 appearances. De Jesús did not play in a game in 2020 due to the cancellation of the minor league season because of the COVID-19 pandemic. He spent the 2021 campaign split between the Double-A Erie SeaWolves and the Triple-A Toledo Mud Hens, working to a 3.34 ERA with 80 strikeouts in 40 appearances between the two affiliates. The Tigers added him to their 40-man roster after following the season on November 19, 2021.

On April 20, 2022, De Jesús was promoted to the major leagues for the first time after Matt Manning was placed on the injured list. De Jesús made his major league debut three days later and pitched two scoreless innings against the Colorado Rockies in the first game of a doubleheader. He was sent back down to Toledo prior to the second game of the doubleheader. De Jesús was recalled by the Tigers on July 15. He was designated for assignment on December 23, 2022. On January 6, 2023, De Jesús was sent outright to Triple-A Toledo.

See also
 List of Major League Baseball players from the Dominican Republic

References

External links

1997 births
Living people
People from Samaná Province
Dominican Republic expatriate baseball players in the United States
Major League Baseball players from the Dominican Republic
Major League Baseball pitchers
Detroit Tigers players
Dominican Summer League Tigers players
Gulf Coast Tigers players
Lakeland Flying Tigers players
West Michigan Whitecaps players
Erie SeaWolves players
Toledo Mud Hens players
Gigantes del Cibao players